Hijack may refer to:

Film and television
 Hijack (1973 film), an American made-for-television film
 Hijack! (1975 film), a British film sponsored by the Children's Film Foundation
 Hijack (2008 film), a Bollywood film starring Shiney Ahuja and Esha Deol
 "Hijack" (The Professionals), a 1980 episode of the crime-action drama series

Music

Groups
 Hijack (group), a 1990s British hiphop group
 Hijack (Thai band), a 1990s Thai boy band

Albums
 Hijack (Amon Düül II album), a 1974 album
 ¡Soltad a Barrabás!, a 1974 album by Barrabás originally released as Hi-Jack in some countries

Songs
 "High Jack", a song from the Psychic TV discography
 "Hi-Jack", a 1974 song by Barrabás and popularized by Herbie Mann in the US
 "Hijack", a song from Blows Against the Empire, a 1970 album by Paul Kantner and Jefferson Starship
 "Hijack", a song from Hotel California, a 2013 album

See also
 Hijacking (disambiguation)
 LoJack, a stolen vehicle recovery system
 Hijack seat, see Glossary of poker terms